Haplodiscus is a genus of acoels belonging to the family Convolutidae.

Species:

Haplodiscus acuminatus 
Haplodiscus bocki 
Haplodiscus incola 
Haplodiscus obtusus 
Haplodiscus ovatus 
Haplodiscus piger 
Haplodiscus ussovi 
Haplodiscus weldoni

References

Acoelomorphs